The year 1677 in music involved some significant events.

Events 
 September 10 – Henry Purcell is appointed a musician to the court of Charles II of England.
 Charles Davenant's "semi-opera" Circe, with music by composer John Banister, is performed in London by the Duke's Company in May.
 Nikolay Diletsky publishes  (Грамматика музикийского пения, "A grammar of musical song").
 Fabian Stedman publishes Tintinnalogia, or, the Art of Ringing in England.

Publications 
Giovanni Battista Bassani – Balletti, Correnti, Gighe e Sarabande a due violini e basso continuo, Op.1
Johann Melchior Gletle – Expeditionis musicae classis IV, Op.5
Nicolas Lebègue – Pièces de Clavecin, Premier Livre
Isabella Leonarda – Mottetti, Op.7.
Stefano Pasino – Guida e consequenti dell'opera composta in canoni ... cioè Salmi a 4. voci C A T B..., Op. 7 (Venice: Giuseppe Sala)

Classical music 
David Funck – Stricturæ viola-di gambicæ
Jean-Baptiste Lully – Te Deum, first performed on September 9, for the baptism of Lully's son
Georg Muffat – Violin Sonata in D major
Alessandro Poglietti – Rossignolo
Lucas Ruiz de Ribayaz – Luz y Norte

Opera 
Carlo Grossi – La Giocasta, regina d'Armenia
Jean-Baptiste Lully – Isis

Births
February 2 – Jean-Baptiste Morin, composer (died 1745)
February 4 – Johann Ludwig Bach, violinist and composer, second cousin of Johann Sebastian Bach (died 1731)
February 26 – Nicola Fago, composer and music teacher (died 1745)
June 18 – Antonio Maria Bononcini, cellist and composer, brother of Giovanni Bononcini (died 1726)
September 27 – Giovanni Carlo Maria Clari, composer (died 1754)
date unknown – Christian Petzold, organist and composer (died c.1733)

Deaths 
March – Robert Cambert, opera composer (born c.1628)
August – Matthew Locke, composer (born 1621)
November 11 – Barbara Strozzi, Italian singer and composer (born 1619)
date unknown – Robert Cambert, composer of opera (born 1628)

References

 
17th century in music
Music by year